Rende is a comune (municipality) in the province of Cosenza, Calabria, Italy, home to the headquarters of the University of Calabria. It has a population of about 35,000, or more than 60,000 if the university students living there are taken into account. 

The city is divided into two parts: the old town, on a high hill, and the modern area, on level ground, which is fully connected to the city of Cosenza and central to the cultural and economic life of the urban area.

Geography 

Rende stretches from the left river of the Crati to the mountains called "Serre Cosentine".
 Southern borders: Cosenza, Castrolibero, Marano Marchesato and Marano Principato.
 Northern borders: Montalto Uffugo and San Vincenzo La Costa.
 Western borders: San Fili.
 Eastern borders: Castiglione Cosentino, Rose, San Pietro in Guarano and Zumpano.

The municipality counts the hamlets (frazioni) of Arcavacata, Commenda, Quattromiglia, Roges, Santo Stefano, Saporito and Surdo.

The territory presents mountain areas from west that degrade slowly eastward forming hills, one of which is the historic centre, until the valley of the Crati. Thanks to large flat areas, it is covered by the modern city. The most important rivers crossing Rende are Crati, Campagnano, Surdo and Emoli.

History
The Oenotrians founded here a town named Acheruntia and, later, Pandosia. However, several inhabitants later moved to a more defendable area, corresponding to the modern frazione of Nogiano, founding (c. 520 BC) the new settlement of Aruntia, later, Arintha. This is mentioned by the ancient Greek historian Hecataeus of Miletus as a Bruttian town of Oenotrian origins.

During Roman times, the town followed the history of the nearby Cosentia. After a long resistance, it was sacked by Totila's troops in 547, during the Gothic Wars. In the 8th-10th centuries, it was sometimes attacked by Saracen troops, until part of the population moved in what is now the territory of Castiglione Cosentino. Later it was controlled by the Normans and subsequently other southern Italian (sometimes of foreign origin) dynasties.

Main sights
 Norman Castle, built in 1095 by Bohemond I of Antioch.
Mother church of Santa Maria Maggiore, built around 12th century but rebuilt several times, the last in the late 18th century
Sanctuary of Maria Santissima di Costantinopoli

Economy 

The economy of Rende is mostly based on the University of Calabria. In comparison to the rest of southern Italy, Rende has quite a strong economy and is therefore in full expansion. While full industrialization has not yet been very successful, in recent times, major companies have established offices in Rende. Among these are the Japanese Digital and Data Innovation company NTT Data, which has a Research and Development office in Rende; and JRS Silvateam Food Ingredients.

Sports 
Rende is home to the football team Rende Calcio, which competes in the official semi-professional tournament (C2)

References

Sources
 
 
 
  Alternate 1990 2nd edition

External links

Official website